Leigh Mall is a shopping mall located in Columbus, Mississippi. The mall was constructed in 1973, and is marketed by Sterling Properties. The anchor stores are Dollar Tree, Hobby Lobby, Planet Fitness, and Burke's Outlet. There is 1 vacant anchor store that was once JCPenney.

History
Leigh Mall was built in 1973 by Jim Wilson & Associates and sold to Equitable Real Estate in 1987. J. C. Penney and Sears were the original anchor stores.

Sears closed in 2012 and became Hobby Lobby one year later. J. C. Penney closed in 2017. The mall was auctioned off in 2019, at which point it was nearly 57 percent occupied.

References

Shopping malls in Mississippi
Shopping malls established in 1973
1973 establishments in Mississippi
Buildings and structures in Lowndes County, Mississippi